The 2022–23 Houston Cougars men's basketball team represents the University of Houston in the 2022–23 NCAA Division I men's basketball season. The Cougars are led by ninth-year head coach Kelvin Sampson. The team plays their home games at the Fertitta Center as members of the American Athletic Conference. In September 2021, Houston and fellow conference members Cincinnati and UCF accepted bids to join the Big 12 Conference. The schools had been contractually required to remain with The American through 2024, but all reached a separation agreement that will allow them to join the Big 12 in 2023. Accordingly, the 2022–23 season will be the program's last season as a member of The American.

On November 28, 2022, the team reached the number one ranking in the AP Poll, marking the first time they had held the top spot since 1983.

Previous season
Houston finished its 2021–22 regular season with an overall record of 26–5. They were regular-season champions of the American Conference with a record of 15–3 in conference play. They entered the conference tournament as the #1 seed and proceeded to win the tournament, defeating Memphis 71–53 in the final. The Cougars entered the NCAA tournament as the #5 seed in the South Regional. Houston went 3–1 in the tournament, reaching the Elite Eight before falling 44–50 to Villanova in the regional final.

Houston finished the season with a record of 32–6 and a ranking of #7 in the final Coaches Poll.

Offseason

Departing players

Incoming Transfers

2022 Recruiting class

2023 Recruiting class

Preseason

AAC preseason media poll

On October 12, The American released the preseason Poll and other preseason awards

Preseason Awards
 Player of the Year - Marcus Sasser
 Rookie of the Year - Jarace Walker
 All-AAC First Team - Marcus Sasser
 All-AAC Second Team - Jamal Shead

Roster

Schedule and results

|-
!colspan=12 style=| Non-conference regular season

|-
!colspan=12 style=| AAC Regular Season

|-
!colspan=12 style=| AAC tournament

|-
!colspan=12 style=| NCAA tournament

Source

Rankings

*AP does not release post-NCAA Tournament rankings

Awards and honors

All-American
Marcus Sasser – AP (1st), USBWA (1st), NABC (1st), SN (2nd)

American Athletic Conference honors

All-AAC Awards
Player of the Year: Marcus Sasser
Coach of the Year: Kelvin Sampson
Freshman of the Year: Jarace Walker
Defensive Player of the Year: Jamal Shead
Most Improved Player: J'Wan Roberts
Sixth Man of the Year: Reggie Chaney

All-AAC First Team
Marcus Sasser

All-AAC Second Team
Jamal Shead
J'Wan Roberts
Jarace Walker

All-Freshman Team
Jarace Walker
Terrance Arceneaux
Emanuel Sharp

Source

References

Houston
Houston Cougars men's basketball seasons
Houston
Houston
Houston